Dick Millman is the former CEO of Bell Helicopter.  He has resided in this position since 2007. Before Bell, Millman was president of Textron Systems following a 20-year career with Avco.

References

Living people
20th-century American businesspeople
21st-century American businesspeople
Textron
Year of birth missing (living people)